Kevin O'Driscoll (born 10 November 1989) is an Irish Gaelic footballer who plays for West Cork Junior Championship club Tadhg McCarthaigh's and formerly at inter-county level with the Cork senior football team. He usually lines out as a right wing-forward.

O'Driscoll's brothers, Brian and Colm, as well as his father, Gene, have all played for Cork.

Honours

University College Cork
Sigerson Cup (1): 2011

Tadhg Mac Carthaigh's
South West Junior A Football Championship (2): 2006, 2012

Cork
National Football League Division 1 (2): 2011, 2012
National Football League Division 3 (1): 2020
All-Ireland Under-21 Football Championship (1): 2009
Munster Under-21 Football Championship (1): 2009
Munster Minor Football Championship (1): 2007

References

External link
Kevin O'Driscoll profile at the Cork GAA website

1989 births
Living people
Tadhg Mac Cárthaigh's Gaelic footballers
Carbery Gaelic footballers
Cork inter-county Gaelic footballers